Shivamani is a 2009 Indian Kannada-language film directed by S K Amarnath, starring Sriimurali and Sharmiela Mandre in lead roles.

Cast

 Sriimurali as Siva
 Sharmiela Mandre as Shruthi
 Ramesh Bhat
 Avinash as Subbanna
 Vinaya Prasad 
 Shobaraj as Nakarar Narayana 
 Kote Prabhakar
 Mahesh
 Besant Ravi

Music

Reception

Critical response 

R G Vijayasarathy of Rediff.com scored the film at 1.5 out of 5 stars and says "The film is digitally graded and Venkat's cinematographic work is good. Debutant Veera Samarth has delivered two nice compositions including the popular Moda Modala Nota. Overall, however it's best to avoid this torture". The New Indian Express wrote "Meanwhile, Narayan’s henchman tries to rape a widow. This enrages Siva, prompting him to teach Narayana a lesson. And of course, Narayana does not keep quiet. He organises several goons to attack Siva. Finally, how Siva teaches Narayana a lesson is the climax. If you are interested in watching an out-and-out action film, you could consider booking your tickets for this one". Bangalore Mirror wrote "Except for pleasing images and some good music by Veer Samarth there is nothing in the film that you want to even remember".

References

2000s Kannada-language films
2009 films